Ascension Theory are a progressive metal band formed in 2002. They are signed to Nightmare Records. They have released two full studio albums (Regeneration and Answers). Songs from Regenaration reached No. 2 on progressive metal download charts.

Discography 
 Regeneration (2002)
 Answers (2005)

Members 
 Chad Lenig - drums
 Tim Becker - keyboards
 Jodi St. John - vocals
 Leon Ozug - vocals, guitars

References

External links
Ascension Theory official website

American progressive metal musical groups
Musical groups established in 2002
2002 establishments in the United States